The Wilkes-Barre City Police Department or W-BPD, is the law enforcement agency of the city of Wilkes-Barre, Pennsylvania and its surrounding townships. The current acting Chief of Police is Joseph Coffay. The Wilkes-Barre Police Department current has a total number 92 sworn police officers. The police department also uses K-9 units and patrolman formerly used horses for transport in certain areas. However, the use of horses was discontinued in 2006.

The first uniformed policeman/constable of Wilkes-Barre was Frederick W. Meyer, who lived between 1835 and 1903, a Bavarian immigrant and infantryman who formerly worked at Baer & Stegmaier. Frederick "always endeavored to perform his duty and aimed to be a good citizen. And he is proud that he is an American citizen”

Known chiefs of police

 B. F. Meyers (1800s)
 Joseph Coyne (?- 1999)
 William Barrett (1999-2004) 
 Gerard Dessoye (2004-2014)
 Robert Hughes (2014-2016)
 Marcella Lendacky (2016-2018) (acting) 
 Joseph Coffay (2018- Present)

References

Municipal police departments of Pennsylvania